Heiner Brand (born 26 July 1952 in Gummersbach) is a former West German handball player. He was the Germany men's national handball team coach from 1997 to 2011. He is the only person who has won the world handball championship both as a player (in 1978) and as a coach (in 2007).

Career as player 
Heiner Brand joined at the age of seven the handball club VfL Gummersbach. He was with that club six times German champion (1973, 1974, 1975, 1976, 1982 and 1983) and won four times the DHB-Pokal (1978, 1979, 1982 and 1983). He also became with that club internationally successful (European Cup winner in 1978 and 1979, European National Championship winner in 1974 in 1983, Super cup winner in 1979 and 1983, IHF cup winner in 1982).

Heiner Brand was also successful in the Germany men's national handball team, where he played a total of 131 games and scored 231 goals, including one penalty throw. In 1976, he was a member of the West German team that finished fourth in the Olympic tournament in Montreal. He played all six matches and scored twelve goals. In 1978, he was the World champion at the World Men's Handball Championship. His first two international goals he scored in his first game for Germany was on July 1, 1974 in Holon against Israel.

Career as coach 

Heiner Brand has been a long-time coach for VfL Gummersbach (1987–91 and 1994–96). In between, he was the coach for SG Wallau-Massenheim (1992–94). Even before becoming a club coach, he was an assistant coach of the German national team (1984–87), in which he became the full-time coach on 1 January 1997. At the beginning of the new millennium, he raised the national team to the top. After the vice European Championship in 2002 and the vice World Cup in 2003, the DHB selection won in 2004 the European Championship and the same year the silver medal at the Summer Olympics in Athens.

It was announced on 24 October 2007 that Brand's contract of the National team with the DHB would be extended until 30 June 2013. However, it was announced on 16 May 2011 that his post of national coach would expire on 30 June 2011. The results were the tenth place at the 2010 European Championship and the eleventh place at the 2011 World Championship. It was the worst result in the history of the German National Championship.  Since 1. Juli 2011  Martin Heuberger is the successor to Heiner Brand. Since 1 November 2004 Heuberger has been Assistant to Heiner Brand and Co-coach of the German National Handball team.

Personal life 
Brand is married and has two children. He has two older brothers named Klaus (born 1942) and Jochen (born 1944). Both also played for the German national handball team.

His trademark since the 1970s is his bushy walrus moustache.

Success as coach 
1984 : Summer Olympics in Los Angeles, silver medal (as assistant coach)
1988 : German Champion with VfL Gummersbach
1991 : German Champion with VfL Gummersbach
1993 : German Champion with SG Wallau-Massenheim
1993 : DHB cup winner with SG Wallau-Massenheim
1993 : European Champion finalist with SG Wallau-Massenheim
1994 : DHB cup winner with SG Wallau-Massenheim
1998 : Super cup winner with the national team
1998 : European Championship, third place
1999 : World Cup, fifth place
2000 : Summer Olympics in Sydney, fifth place
2001 : Super cup winner with the national team
2002 : Vice-European Champion, lost against Sweden
2003 : Vice-World Champion, lost against Croatia
2004 : European Champion against Slovenia (biggest success since the 1978 World Cup in Denmark)
2004 : Summer Olympics in Athens, silver medal, lost again against Croatia
2006 : European Championship, fifth place
2007 : World Champion with the German national team against Poland
2008 : European Championship, fourth place
2008 : Summer Olympics in Beijing, ninth place
2009 : World Cup, fifth place
2009 : Super cup winner with the national team
2010 : European Championship, tenth place
2011 : World Championship, eleventh place

References

External links
 Official website 

1952 births
Living people
West German male handball players
Olympic handball players of West Germany
Handball players at the 1976 Summer Olympics
German handball coaches
People from Gummersbach
Sportspeople from Cologne (region)
Recipients of the Cross of the Order of Merit of the Federal Republic of Germany
Members of the Order of Merit of North Rhine-Westphalia